McCaskill is a surname. Notable people with the surname include:

 Amal McCaskill (born 1973), American professional basketball  player
 Billie June McCaskill (1930–2011), American herbarium curator 
 Claire McCaskill (born 1953), U.S. Senator from Missouri
 Ian McCaskill (1938–2016), British weatherman
 Kirk McCaskill (born 1961), Canadian professional baseball player

See also
MacAskill (disambiguation)